Dr. Basant Kumar Misra is a neurosurgeon specialising in treating brain, spine, cerebrovascular and peripheral nervous system disorders, injuries, pathologies and malformations. He is the Vice-President of the World Federation of Neurosurgical Societies, and the former President of the Asian Australasian Society of Neurological Surgeons, and the Neurological Society of India.  He is a recipient of Dr. B. C. Roy Award, the highest medical honour in India.

Early life and education
Basant Misra was born in Bhubaneswar to eminent economist, Dr. Baidyanath Misra and Mrs. Basanti Misra, a homemaker. He did his schooling from the Demonstration Multipurpose School, Bhubaneswar, MBBS from the Government Medical College, Sambalpur, his MS General Surgery from Delhi University, his MCh in Neurosurgery from AIIMS, New Delhi and DNB Neurosurgery from the National Board of Examinations. He received Commonwealth Medical Scholarship to the University of Edinburgh.

Career

He started his career as a Research officer at the Indian Council of Medical Research, and is currently the Chairman & Chief of Surgery, and Head of the Neurosurgery department at Hinduja Hospitals, Mumbai.

His notable patients include Hrithik Roshan, Salman Khan, Abhijat Joshi, Anand Kumar, among others
 He is the first neurosurgeon in the world to perform image-guided surgery for aneurysms.
 He is the first neurosurgeon in South Asia to perform gamma knife radiosurgery.
 He is the first neurosurgeon in India to perform endoscopic spinal surgery.
 He is the first neurosurgeon in India to perform awake craniotomy.

He is also working with Dr. B. Ravi, institute chair professor of Mechanical engineering and the founder of Biomedical Engineering and Technology (incubation) Centre (BETiC) at IIT Bombay, to co-develop biomedical devices.

He has authored and co-authored more than 200 publications in peer-reviewed national and international journals.

He started the 6-year DNB course in Neurosurgery for MBBS graduates (one of the only 32 NBE-accredited tertiary-care institutions in India) and a 3-month fellowship programme (one of only 23 WFNS-accredited Class-1 postgraduate training centres in the world) at Hinduja Hospital. He also conducts cadaveric demonstrations, hands-on dissection workshops, seminars and CME courses. He has previously taught at SCTIMST (an Institute of National Importance), Australian School of Advanced Medicine and Harvard Medical School.

Posts 

He is holding / has held the following positions: 
 1st Vice-President of World Federation of Neurosurgical Societies
 President (2016-'20), World Federation of Skull Base Societies 
 President (2015-'17), International Conference on Cerebrovascular Surgery 
 President (2015-'19), Asian Australasian Society of Neurological Surgeons 
 President (2004-'06), Asian Congress of Neurological Surgeons
 President (2008-'09), Neurological Society of India
 President (2002-'04), Skull Base Surgery Society of India
 President (2010-'11), Cerebrovascular Society of India 
 President (2009-'10), Bombay Neurosciences Association

Awards 

 Distinguished Alumnus Award (1969) - Demonstration Multipurpose School, Bhubaneswar
 Best Graduate Award (1975) - Sambalpur University
 Best Post-Graduate Award (1980) - Delhi University
 Commonwealth Medical Scholarship (1984) - British Medical Council
 Dr. B. C. Roy National Award (2018) - Medical Council of India
 International Lifetime Recognition Award (2020) - American Association of Neurological Surgeons

Charity 

He runs a free weekly clinic at Hinduja Hospital, Mahim, providing free consultations to patients from the weaker sections of the society. He also waives off his surgical fees, either partially or completely.

Along with Cardiac surgeon, Ramakanta Panda and former Police Commissioner of Mumbai, Arup Patnaik, he set up the Konark Cancer Foundation for patients coming to the Tata Memorial Hospital for cancer treatment, providing them with financial support of up to INR 1 lac per patient, logistical support such as finding food and shelter for their attendants, providing other voluntary support, collecting and donating blood, medications and prosthesis. Around 10,000 patients and their families have been benefited since its inception.

He started the Baidyanath Neurosurgery Charitable Trust to fund travelling fellowships of young neurosurgeons (below 40 years) from both public and private sectors, and of senior neurosurgeons from only the public sector, seeking advanced training abroad.

References 

Sambalpur University alumni
Delhi University alumni
All India Institute of Medical Sciences, New Delhi alumni
Alumni of the University of Edinburgh
Indian neurosurgeons
Indian neuroscientists
Indian neurologists
Indian epileptologists
Indian philanthropists
Dr. B. C. Roy Award winners
1953 births
Living people
People from Odisha
Medical doctors from Odisha
People from Bhubaneswar
People from Maharashtra
Medical doctors from Maharashtra
Medical doctors from Mumbai